The 1995–96 Division 1 season was the 58th since its establishment. Auxerre won their first league title in history with 72 points.

Participating teams

 Auxerre
 Bastia
 Bordeaux
 AS Cannes
 FC Gueugnon
 EA Guingamp
 Le Havre AC
 RC Lens
 Lille OSC
 Olympique Lyonnais
 FC Martigues
 FC Metz
 AS Monaco
 Montpellier HSC
 FC Nantes Atlantique
 OGC Nice
 Paris Saint-Germain FC
 Stade Rennais FC
 AS Saint-Étienne
 RC Strasbourg

League table 

Promoted from Ligue 2, who will play in Division 1 season 1996/1997
 SM Caen : champion of Ligue 2
 Olympique Marseille : runners-up
 AS Nancy : 3rd place

Results

Top goalscorers

References

External links
France 1995/96 at Rec.Sport.Soccer Statistics Foundation

Ligue 1 seasons
France
1